The Leisure Seeker is a 2017 comedy-drama film directed by Paolo Virzì, in his first full English-language feature. The film is based on the 2009 novel of the same name by Michael Zadoorian. It stars Helen Mirren and Donald Sutherland, acting together for the first time since the 1990 film Bethune: The Making of a Hero. It was screened in the main competition section of the 74th Venice International Film Festival. Mirren received a Golden Globe nomination for her work in the film.

Cast

 Donald Sutherland as John Spencer
 Helen Mirren as Ella Spencer
 Christian McKay as Will Spencer
 Janel Moloney as Jane Spencer
 Dana Ivey as Lillian
 Dick Gregory as Dan Coleman
 Kirsty Mitchell as Jennifer Ward
 Robert Pralgo as Phillip
 Mylie Stone as Emily Ward

Production

Development
The film reunited director Paolo Virzì with producers Fabrizio Donvito, Benedetto Habib, and Marco Cohen from the Indiana Production Company, since their collaboration in Human Capital and Like Crazy which also won many festival awards. It is also the director's first film shot solely in English.

Sutherland and Mirren had previously collaborated as a married couple in the Phillip Borsos directed China-set saga, Bethune: The Making of a Hero, and this is their first film together for 27 years.

Filming
Principal photography for the film began in July 2016 in Atlanta, where the crew's cars were damaged on set by flooding. A casting call for extras was sent out, and filming also took place in Stone Mountain and Dunwoody, Georgia.  Other important scenes included Jekyll Island, Georgia, US 1 in Key West and the Hemingway House in Key West, Florida.  Fisherman's Hospital is located in Marathon, Florida.

Release
The film, based on the novel by Michael Zadoorian, was sold at Cannes by BAC Films. On August 30, 2017, Focus Features acquired the UK rights to the film. It was released on March 9, 2018.

Reception

Box office 
The Leisure Seeker grossed $3.2 million in the United States and Canada, and $14.6 million in other territories, for a worldwide total of $17.8 million.

Critical reception
On review aggregator Rotten Tomatoes, the film holds an approval rating of 38% based on 109 reviews, and an average rating of 5.2/10. The website's critical consensus reads, "The Leisure Seeker certainly doesn't suffer from any shortage of acting talent, but it's largely squandered on a predictable, diffuse drama with little to say." On Metacritic, the film has a weighted average score of 45 out of 100, based on 23 critics, indicating "mixed or average reviews".

References

External links
 
 
 
 For Better or Worse: A Gendered Outlook of the films The Leisure Seeker and Alaska

2017 films
2010s English-language films
English-language French films
English-language Italian films
Films directed by Paolo Virzì
Films shot in Atlanta
Films shot in Florida
2010s road comedy-drama films
Films based on American novels
Italian road comedy-drama films
Films about old age
Films about Alzheimer's disease
2017 comedy films
2017 drama films
French road comedy-drama films
2010s French films